Colorful refers to the quality of possessing prominent and varied colors.

Colorful or Colourful may also refer to:

 Colorful (manga), a 1998-2000 manga by Torajirō Kishi and an adapted 1999 anime series
 Colourful (film), a Malayalam film of 2006
 Colorful (film), a 2010 Japanese animated film by Keiichi Hara
 "Colorful" (9nine song), 2013
 "Colorful" (ClariS song), 2013
 "Colorful" (Jun Shibata song), 2007
 "Colourful", a song by The Parlotones from Radiocontrolledrobot, 2005
 "Colorful", a song by Rocco DeLuca and the Burden from I Trust You to Kill Me, 2006
 "Colorful", a song by The Verve Pipe from Underneath, 2001
 Colourful Radio, a commercial radio station in London
 Colorful Technology, a Chinese electronics company

See also 
 Colorfulness, a concept referring to the perceived intensity of a specific color
 Color (disambiguation)